Thomas E. Sanders (often simply credited as Tom Sanders, sometimes Thomas Sanders) (1953 – July 6, 2017) was an American production designer. He has been nominated for two Academy Awards in the category Best Art Direction.

His filmography includes Hook (1991), Bram Stoker's Dracula (1992), Braveheart (1995), Saving Private Ryan (1998), Apocalypto (2006), and Crimson Peak (2015). Sanders died of cancer on July 6, 2017, aged 63.

Filmography

 Revenge (1990)
 Days of Thunder (1990)
 Naked Tango (1991)
 Hook (1991)
 Bram Stoker's Dracula (1992)
 Maverick (1994)
 Braveheart (1995)
 Assassins (1995)
 Father's Day (1997)
 Saving Private Ryan (1998)
 Mission: Impossible 2 (2000)
 We Were Soldiers (2002)
 Rumor Has It (2005)
 Apocalypto (2006)
 Eagle Eye (2008)
 Edge of Darkness (2010)
 Venom in Vegas (2010, TV documentary)
 Secretariat (2010)
 Red Riding Hood (2011)
 After Earth (2013)
 Crimson Peak (2015)
 Star Trek Beyond (2016)

References

External links

Tom Sanders web site

1953 births
2017 deaths
Deaths from cancer
American production designers
People from San Pedro, Los Angeles